Mauricio Arnoldo Quintanilla Flores (born October 31, 1981 in Ilopango, El Salvador) is a Salvadoran professional footballer.

Club career

ADET
Quintanilla signed with ADET in 1999.

Luis Ángel Firpo
Quintanilla signed with Luis Ángel Firpo in 2001.

Nejapa FC
Quintanilla signed with Nejapa FC in 2007.

Second to Luis Ángel Firpo
After left Nejapa FC, Quintanilla signed again with Luis Ángel Firpo. He played with the team of Usulután at the 2008–09 CONCACAF Champions League Group Stage.

Alianza FC
Quintanilla signed with Alianza FC in 2009.

Municipal Limeño
In 2016, Quintanilla signed with Municipal Limeño.

International career
Quintanilla made his debut for El Salvador in a March 2001 friendly match against Guatemala and has earned a total of 5 caps, scoring no goals.

All of these games were friendlies, though he was a non-playing squad member at the 2003 CONCACAF Gold Cup.

His final international game was an August 2004 friendly match, also against Guatemala.

Honours

Club 
ADET
 Primera División
 Runners-up: Clausura 2000

Luis Ángel Firpo
 Primera División
 Champion: Apertura 2007, Clausura 2008, Clausura 2013
 Runners-up: Apertura 2001, Clausura 2003, Clausura 2005, Clausura 2007

Alianza FC
 Primera División
 Champion: Clausura 2011
 Runners-up: Apertura 2010

References

External links
 Mauricio Quintanilla at Soccerway 

1981 births
Living people
People from San Salvador Department
Association football defenders
Salvadoran footballers
El Salvador international footballers
2003 CONCACAF Gold Cup players
C.D. Luis Ángel Firpo footballers
Nejapa footballers
Alianza F.C. footballers